Bay St. George South  is a local service district and designated place in the Canadian province of Newfoundland and Labrador on the south coast of Bay St. George, a large bay on the west coast of the island of Newfoundland. Bay St. George South consists nine communities, namely Heatherton, Robinsons, Cartyville, McKay's, Jeffrey's, St. David's, St. Fintan's, Lock Leven en Highlands.

In 2016 the local service district had 1,103 inhabitants.

Geography 
Bay St. George South is in Newfoundland within Subdivision B of Division No. 4.

Demographics 

Government 
Bay St. George South is a local service district (LSD) that is governed by a committee responsible for the provision of certain services to the community. The chair of the LSD committee is Lloyd Harnum.

See also 
List of communities in Newfoundland and Labrador
List of designated places in Newfoundland and Labrador
List of local service districts in Newfoundland and Labrador

References 

Designated places in Newfoundland and Labrador
Local service districts in Newfoundland and Labrador